Phrynocephalus clarkorum, also known commonly as the Afghan toad-headed agama and Clark's toad-headed agama, is a species of lizard in the family Agamidae. The species is native to parts of Central and South Asia.

Etymology
This species was named after American herpetologists Richard J. Clark and his wife Erica D. Clark (the specific name clarkorum is plural) for their contributions to herpetology. They worked together and co-wrote the paper "Report on a Collection of Amphibians and Reptiles from Turkey" (1973).

Geographic range
P. clarkorum is found in Afghanistan and Pakistan.

Habitat
The preferred natural habitats of P. clarkorum are desert and shrubland.

Behavior
P. clarkorum is terrestrial and diurnal.

Reproduction
P. clarkorum is oviparous. Breeding takes place in sprigtime, from March to May. Clutch size is 2–6 eggs.

References

Further reading
Anderson SC, Leviton AE (1967). "A new species of Phrynocephalus (Sauria: Agamidae) from Afghanistan, with remarks on Phrynocephalus ornatus Boulenger". Proceedings of the California Academy of Sciences, Fourth Series 35: 227–234. (Phrynicephalus clarkorum, new species).
Sindaco R, Jeremčenko VK (2008). The Reptiles of The Western Palearctic. 1. Annotated Checklist and Distributional Atlas of the Turtles, Crocodiles, Amphisbaenians and Lizards of Europe, North Africa, Middle East and Central Asia. (Monographs of the Societas Herpetologica Italica). Latina, Italy: Edizioni Belvedere. 580 pp. .

clarkorum
Reptiles described in 1967
Taxa named by Steven C. Anderson
Taxa named by Alan E. Leviton